Glibenclamide/metformin, also known as glyburide/metformin and sold under the brand name Glucovance, is a fixed-dose combination anti-diabetic medication used to treat type 2 diabetes. It contains glibenclamide, a sulfonylureas, and metformin, a biguanide.

References

External links 
 

Bristol Myers Squibb
Combination drugs